Irina Cheluskina (born 1 February 1961 in Kherson) is a Ukrainian and Serbian chess player and a Woman Grandmaster.

She has won the USSR Women's Chess Championship once, the Women's Yugoslav Chess Championship three times and the Serbian-Montenegrin championship twice.

External links 
 
 
 
 
 

1961 births
Living people
Serbian female chess players
Ukrainian female chess players
Chess woman grandmasters
Sportspeople from Kherson
Naturalized citizens of Serbia